Ronny Palumbo (born 22 April 1991) is a Italy international rugby league footballer who last played as a  and  for the London Broncos in the Betfred Championship.

Background
Palumbo was born in Campbelltown, New South Wales, Australia. He is of Italian descent. 

He played his junior rugby league for the Campbelltown Harlequins,while attending well renowned rugby league school Patrician Brothers' College, Fairfield.

Playing career

Club career
He played for the New South Wales Schoolboys Rugby Union side in 2008/2009. 

Palumbo played in the New South Wales Cup for the Manly-Warringah Sea Eagles and the Western Suburbs Magpies.

In the 2017–18 season he played for Toulouse Olympique. 

In 2018, Palumbo was granted a mid season release from Toulouse Olympique to join Mystic River Rugby Club , helping the club win the 2018 USA Rugby D1 National Championship.

In 2019 Palumbo played for the London Skolars in Betfred League 1. 

In the 2020–21 season he played for the Palau Broncos in the Elite 1 Championship. 

He joined London Broncos at the start of the 2022 season.

International career
In 2019 Palumbo made his international début for Italy against Malta. In 2022 he was named in the Italy squad for the 2021 Rugby League World Cup.

In the final group match at the 2021 Rugby League World Cup, Palumbo scored Italy's only try in their 66-6 loss against Australia.

References

External links
London Broncos profile
Italy profile

1991 births
Living people
Australian rugby league players
Australian rugby union players
Australian people of Italian descent
Italy national rugby league team players
London Broncos players
Mystic River Rugby players
Rugby league players from Sydney
Rugby league second-rows
Western Suburbs Magpies players